Sol TV is a Peruvian television station, which transmits its signal since 2003, from Trujillo city for Peru. The channel belongs to the company Cruzado Saucedo. It was the first regional channel airing in the city of Trujillo.

History
Sol TV is one of the most watched channels on regional television. Since 2003, more than 08 years without interruption, was the first channel to air in the city of Trujillo. Transmits and sponsors the "International Spring Festival," the "Marinera Festival", etc. This channel has also a programming including  news important as presidential and municipal elections, movies and local programs, etc.

See also
Trujillo
Victor Larco District

External links
Trujillo,  (Wikimapia)

References

Television stations in Trujillo, Peru
Television channels and stations established in 2003
2003 establishments in Peru